Murad Abro was a minister of the Balochistan Government. And a member of the Jamote Qaumi Movement. He was the son of Abdul Malik Abro and brother of Murtaza Abro. He died in a road accident in October 2008. He was a great politician of his time. He remained minister in the caretaker government of 2007–2008.

See also 
 Mir Gul Hassan Manjhoo
 Jamote Qaumi Movement

References

External links 
 Mir Murad Abro Profile
 Jamot Qomi Movement
  the daily DAWN, former provincial minister Balochistan Sardar Muhammad Murad Abro was killed in road accident
 Jam condoles death of Jamot
 Government of Balochistan - Official site

1966 births
2008 deaths
Jamote people
People from Nasirabad District